Maria Romanjuk (born 15 August 1996) is an Estonian swimmer. She competed in the women's 100 metre breaststroke event at the 2016 Summer Olympics. She is 46-time long course and 41-time short course Estonian swimming champion. She has broken 15 Estonian records in swimming.

See also
 List of Estonian records in swimming

References

External links
 Biography at esbl.ee 
 

1996 births
Living people
Swimmers from Tallinn
Estonian female breaststroke swimmers
Olympic swimmers of Estonia
Swimmers at the 2016 Summer Olympics
21st-century Estonian women